Coletta may refer to:

 Coletta (reptile), an extinct genus of basal procolophonid parareptile
 Coletta (surname)
 Coletta Rydzek (born 1997), German cross-country skier

See also 
 Colette (disambiguation)
 Colletta (disambiguation)